Syedpur, is a village in Jagannathpur Upazila, Sunamganj District. The village is named after its founder Syed Shamsuddin, son of Syed Alauddin, a disciple of Hazrat Shah Jalal, who arrived here in the 14th century.

Education

High school
Syedpur Pilot High School

College
Syedpur Adarsha College

Notable people
Syeda Shahar Banu (1914-1983), language activist

See also
 Islampur
 Shaharpara
 Syedpur Shaharpara Union

References

Villages in Jagannathpur Upazila